Ludvig Munthe (11 March 1841 – 30 March 1896) was a Norwegian-born, German landscape painter.

Biography
Ludvig Munthe was born at Årøy, near Sogndal in Sogn og Fjordane, Norway. He came to Bergen in 1858 where he was first instructed by Franz Wilhelm Schiertz, a German painter and architect residing in Norway.  Munthe later moved to Düsseldorf where he became a pupil of Albert Flamm at the Kunstakademie Düsseldorf. He subsequently selected Düsseldorf for his permanent residence.

Munthe is associated with the Düsseldorf school of painting. A thoroughly realistic treatment characterizes his paintings, of which autumn and winter scenes in stormy or gloomy weather, forest and coast views form the prevailing subjects. He was knighted with the French Legion of Honour in 1878 and was appointed Knight of the Order of St. Olav in 1881.

Selected works
Pine Forest in Winter (1870) Hamburg Gallery
Skoginteriør (1870)  National Museum of Art, Architecture and Design, Oslo
Potetopptagning (1873)  National Gallery, Oslo
Norsk strandsted (1878) National Gallery, Oslo
Wood Interior in Winter, with Stags (1878)  National Gallery, Oslo - awarded Gold Medal in Paris
Høst i skogen (1882) National Gallery, Oslo
Sen høstettermiddag (1882)  National Museum of Art, Architecture and Design, Oslo
Birch Wood in Autumn (1886) National Gallery, Berlin
Autumn in Holland (1895)  National Gallery, Berlin

Gallery

References

Other sources
Munthe, Sverre (1994) Familien Munthe i Norge (Oslo: S. Munthe) 
Malmanger, Magne (1981) Norsk malerkunst fra klassisisme til tidlig realisme  (Oslo: Nasjonalgalleriet)

Note

External links

Paintings by Ludwig Munthe at MutualArt Services, Inc.

1841 births
1896 deaths
People from Sogn og Fjordane
Artists from Düsseldorf
19th-century Norwegian painters
19th-century German male artists
19th-century German painters
German male painters
Recipients of the Legion of Honour
Norwegian emigrants to Germany
Norwegian male painters
19th-century Norwegian male artists
Düsseldorf school of painting